The Atlanta BeltLine (also Beltline or Belt Line) is a  open and planned loop of multi-use trail and light rail transit system on a former railway corridor around the core of Atlanta, Georgia. The Atlanta BeltLine is designed to reconnect neighborhoods and communities historically divided and marginalized by infrastructure, improve transportation, add green space, promote redevelopment, create and preserve affordable housing, and showcase arts and culture. The project is in varying stages of development, with several mainline and spur trails complete and others in an unpaved, but hikeable, state. Since the passage of the More MARTA sales tax in 2016, construction of the light rail streetcar system is overseen by MARTA in close partnership with Atlanta BeltLine, Inc.



History and concept

As railroad rights-of-way
The first development of the BeltLine area began when the Atlanta & West Point Railroad began building a  connecting rail line from its northern terminus at Oakland City to Hulsey Yard on the Georgia Railroad (essentially the southeast quarter of the completed BeltLine). The surveys were done and initial construction had begun when the courts ordered a halt in May 1899 as that work did not fall under the A&WP's charter.

In September 1899, a more ambitious charter for an Atlanta Belt Railway Company was announced that would circle the entire city connecting all rail lines so that freight car transfers could occur on the outskirts rather than downtown. Since Clifton was in DeKalb County, both it and Fulton were named in the charter. After surveys of the route and right of way acquisitions, the DeKalb portion was ditched leaving the entire route in Fulton County. The entire line was completed by 1902.

Concept for transformation
The idea to turn the rail corridors into a ring of trails and parks originated in a 1999 master's degree thesis by Georgia Tech student Ryan Gravel, who founded the non-profit Friends of the Belt Line and works for Perkins+Will.  Frustrated with the lack of transportation alternatives in Atlanta, Gravel and two of his colleagues, Mark Arnold and Sarah Edgens, summarized his thesis in 2000 and mailed copies to two dozen influential Atlantans. Cathy Woolard, then the city council representative for district six, was an early supporter of the concept. Woolard, Gravel, Arnold, and Edgens spent the next several months promoting the idea of the BeltLine to neighborhood groups, the PATH foundation, and Atlanta business leaders. Supported by Atlanta mayor Shirley Franklin, previous city council president Cathy Woolard, and many others in Atlanta's large business community, the idea grew rapidly during 2003 and 2004.

The railroad tracks and rights-of-way are owned mostly by CSX Transportation, Norfolk Southern, and the Georgia Department of Transportation. Developer Wayne Mason had purchased most of the NS portion, in anticipation of the BeltLine, but later sold it after conflict with the city.

The project (although not the funding for it) is included in the 25-year Mobility 2030 plan of the Atlanta Regional Commission for improving transit. As of 2014, the project's planners estimated they had 17 years left before the project would be completed, and no light-rail lines had yet been built.

In 2005 the Atlanta BeltLine Partnership was formed and in 2006 Atlanta BeltLine, Inc. was formed and work began to develop the project.

Connecting the Comet
In September 2019 the James M. Cox Foundation gave $6 Million to the PATH Foundation which will connect the Silver Comet Trail to The Atlanta Beltline which is expected to be completed by 2022.

In May 2022, the James M. Cox foundation announced a $30 million pledge to the PATH Foundation in support of the Northwest BeltLine trails project. This donation combined with previous gifts ensured that the funding is now in place to complete the full 22-mile trail corridor by 2030.

Route and trails

The BeltLine will feature a continuous path encircling the central part of the city, generally following the old railroad right of way, but departing from it in several areas along the northwest portion of the route. In total,  of multi-use paths are to be built, including spur trails connecting to neighborhoods.  The BeltLine connects 45 diverse neighborhoods, some of which are Atlanta's most underserved parks. The PATH Foundation, which has many years of experience building such trails in the Atlanta area, is a partner in the development of this portion of the system.

As of mid-2017, completed trails include:
Eastside Trail
Northside Trail
Southwest Connector Trail
West End Trail
Westside Trail
as well as interim hiking trails.

Eastside Trail

The Eastside Trail stretches from Piedmont Park in the north to Inman Park and Old Fourth Ward in the south, passing by the greatest concentration of industrial architecture in Atlanta adapted for residential reuse and as offices, retail, dining and shopping, the most notable example being Ponce City Market.

Westside/West End Trail
The first trail to be built on the BeltLine, the 2.4-mile West End Trail, was opened in 2008. It edges the neighborhood of the same name as well as serving Mozley Park and Westview. The trail stretches from White Street to Westview Cemetery and is built next to city streets. In 2013, the project received a federal grant of $18 million to develop the Westside Trail. The Westside Trail, opened in September 2017, is three miles in length and is in the old railroad corridor. The Westside Trail stretches from Washington Park and the MARTA Green (East-West) Line in the north, past West End, ending at University Avenue in Adair Park. Along parts of the Westside Trail, the West End trail runs parallel and just outside of the old rail corridor.

Northside Trail
The first section of the Northside Trail opened in 2010 and forms part of a larger network of trails at the south end of Buckhead, the northern third of the city, in and around Tanyard Creek Park in the Collier Hills area. An additional stretch, the Northside Spur Trail was opened 2015.

The trail will eventually connect to the Peachtree Creek Greenway and the PATH400 once complete.

Southwest Connector Trail
The Southwest Connector Spur Trail stretches through woods, starting at the Lionel Hampton Trail, ending at Westwood Avenue serving the Beecher Hills and Westwood Terrace neighborhoods. The existing 1.15-mile trail is set to be part of an eventual 4.5-mile trail.

Discontinuities

There are five gaps along the BeltLine where rights of way do not connect and thus create larger challenges to the project.
 Armour — Near the Lindbergh Center MARTA station, bisected by two active rail lines. Solving this would involve transit sharing the rail right-of-way and splitting off the trail where Clear Creek joins Peachtree Creek, following Clear Creek around the Armour warehouse properties then tunneling under the active rail lines and I-85 to the Ansley Golf Course then rejoining the BeltLine.
 CSX Hulsey Yard — Near the Inman Park/Reynoldstown MARTA station. A workaround for the trail is to use the existing tunnel at Krog Street.
 Bill Kennedy Way (also known variously as the Glenwood-Memorial Connector and the Glenwood-Wylie Connector) — a bridge spanning I-20 between Glenwood Park/Ormewood Park and Reynoldstown. The proposed fix here is to widen the bridge enough to support trail, transit and motor traffic.
 Washington Park to Joseph E. Boone Boulevard (formerly Simpson Rd)  — near the Ashby MARTA station. Proposals include a span over the MARTA tracks or possibly share the right of way.
 Bankhead — The largest gap is near Maddox Park and involves one of the busiest rail corridors in the state. Proposals include 1) taking the trail east to cross under Hollowell Pkwy; 2) diverting through Mead property at Marietta Blvd; or 3) sharing the road with Lowery (formerly Ashby Street).

The Comet Trail Connection
In September 2019 the James M. Cox Foundation gave $6 Million to the PATH Foundation which will connect the Silver Comet Trail to The Atlanta Beltline which is expected to be completed by 2022. Upon completion, the total combined interconnected trail distance around Atlanta for PATH Foundation trails, the Atlanta BeltLine, and the Silver Comet Trail will be the longest paved trail surface in the U.S., totaling about 300 Miles (480 km).

Parks
In 2004, The Trust for Public Land commissioned Alexander Garvin to produce a report, The BeltLine Emerald Necklace: Atlanta's New Public Realm.  This report showed the public a vision of transformation for the BeltLine. The BeltLine plan calls for the creation of a series of parks throughout the city creating what the working plan, The Beltline Emerald Necklace, calls the 13 "Beltline Jewels"; they would be connected by the trail and transit components of the plan. In total, the BeltLine will create or rejuvenate  of greenspace. The plan would expand these existing parks:

 Enota Park from 
 Maddox Park from 
 Ardmore Park 

It would also create these new parks:
 Peachtree Creek Park  at Peachtree Creek near Buckhead
 Hillside Park  at the current McDaniel CEO facility
 Holtzclaw Park 
 Historic Fourth Ward Park ( at the to-be-renovated Ponce City Market (formerly the Sears building and City Hall East)
 Waterworks Park 
 Westside Park  – roughly twice the size of Piedmont Park – on the site of the former Bellwood Quarry. The  former gravel pit will become a reservoir.

The Trust for Public Land, a national non-profit, partnered with the Atlanta BeltLine project and acquired 33 properties, totaling .  These properties will increase Atlanta's green space by nearly 40%.

Transit

The 22-mile (35 km) light rail streetcar component of the BeltLine plan was originally developed in 1999 as the central focus of a master's thesis by Georgia Tech student Ryan Gravel. The vision has expanded to include trails, parks and greenspace, streetscapes, public art, affordable housing, economic development, environmental sustainability, and historic preservation. In Summer 2012, there was a referendum on whether a 1-cent sales tax (SPLOST) should be implemented to fund traffic and road improvements. If approved, the tax would have funded several streetcar routes along portions of the BeltLine trail and connections to MARTA stations and the Downtown Loop streetcar. The sales tax did not pass.

In 2016, City of Atlanta voters passed the More MARTA sales tax, providing $1.3 billion for the expansion of transit. In 2019, MARTA's Board of Directors adopted the program implementation plan for More MARTA funds, including the expansion of the existing Atlanta Streetcar tracks to the Atlanta BeltLine corridor via the Streetcar East Extension) and the Streetcar West Extension. Also included in the funding are BeltLine Northeast LRT, BeltLine Southwest LRT, and BeltLine Southeast LRT.

Usage issues

In late January 2009, GDOT and Amtrak made an unannounced and last-minute filing with the Surface Transportation Board that would effectively block the northeast part of the BeltLine, instead taking it for future intercity rail. However, this conflict was later resolved.

Art
"Art on the Atlanta BeltLine" is the city of Atlanta's largest temporary public art exhibition that showcases the work of hundreds of visual artists, performers, and musicians along  of the BeltLine corridor. The first exhibition was in 2010. There also is a considerable amount of spontaneous unofficial street art to be found throughout the Beltline ranging from murals to sculptures.

Industrial architecture

Many former industrial buildings alongside the BeltLine, particularly the Eastside Trail, have been repurposed for residential and retail use, such as Amsterdam Walk, Ponce City Market, Ford Factory Lofts, the Krog Street Market, the Telephone Factory Lofts, and the DuPre Excelsior Mill and the Pencil Factory and N. Highland Steel in Inman Park Village.

Controversy 
Due to the massive surge in interest in BeltLine adjacent properties and subsequently increased pricing of such properties, many property developers have purchased land in previously low-income neighborhoods and transformed them into luxury living. After having promised to create 5,600 units of affordable housing, the Atlanta BeltLine Inc., has only funded 785, as of July 2017, with overall BeltLine construction halfway completed, with a 2030 estimated finish. For homes within a half-mile of the BeltLine, home values increased between 17.9 and 26.6% between 2011 and 2015. In 2016, project founder Ryan Gravel resigned from the BeltLine Partnership board of directors. Since Gravel's resignation, there have been several protests to end unregulated gentrification caused by expanding the BeltLine that is displacing Atlantans and diminishing the charm of historic neighborhoods in the city. In 2017, BeltLine CEO Paul Morris resigned.

References

Further reading
 Thomas Wheatley, "How to make the Beltline happen", Creative Loafing, January 20, 2011 – Description of five key BeltLine projects
  Kaid Benfield,, The Atlantic, July 26, 2011 – Assessment of progress on BeltLine development through July 2011

External links
 Beltline Partnership
 BeltLine Neighbors Coalition
 Ryan Gravel's Georgia Tech thesis

Rail trails in Georgia (U.S. state)
Passenger rail transportation in Georgia (U.S. state)
Hiking trails in Atlanta
Urban planning in Georgia (U.S. state)
Transportation in Atlanta
Transportation in Fulton County, Georgia
Proposed railway lines in the United States
Cycling in Atlanta
Elevated parks
Linear parks
Parks in Atlanta
Bike paths in Georgia (U.S. state)